The Rajiv Gandhi Mahila Vikas Pariyojana (RGMVP) is the flagship programme of Rajiv Gandhi Charitable Trust, a registered non-profit institution, working for poverty reduction, women empowerment and rural development in Uttar Pradesh, India since 2002. RGMVP believes that "the poor have a strong desire and innate ability to overcome poverty". It aims to organise poor rural women into community institutions and promotes financial inclusion, health-care, livelihood enhancement, education and environment.

Vision and mission
RGMVP has highlighted its vision "to reduce poverty in India through women as the central change-agents". The stated Mission of the organisation is "to empower poor women by helping them overcome poverty and discrimination through community institutions in the form of SHGs". The organisation thus, seeks to provide the women a platform through which they can access their rights and entitlements, and social and development initiatives can be executed effectively.

Model and strategies

Community Institutions of the Poor
RGMVP aims to organise the rural women and build their institutions to enable them to overcome poverty and channelize their collective strength to access information, services and entitlements. These institutions are organized in a three tier system of Self-Help Groups (SHGs), Village Organizations (VOs) and Block Organizations (BOs). An SHG usually consists of 10–20 poor women, typically from similar socio-economic backgrounds. All SHGs mobilized at the village level are federated into Village Organizations (VOs), representing 150 to 250 poor families drawn from 10 to 20 SHGs. The VOs in turn are federated into Block Organizations (BOs) representing 5000 to 7000 women. These institutions aim to act as a systemic interface between poor people and development initiatives.

Strategies
The key strategies of RGMVP include social mobilization, building of social capital, synergy and convergence, scaling up and the saturation approach.

Programmes

Financial inclusion
RGMVP enables the poor to build capital through their own savings within the SHGs and access credit through SHG-bank linkages. It has garnered support from 17 rural and central banks in its project areas.

Livelihoods
The main focus of RGMVP is on promotion of income generation activities through providing backward linkages to the livelihood activities through specific initiatives on agriculture and dairy, livestock management and non-farm activities to ensure that every poor household has at least two or three sources of income.

Agriculture and dairy: Under the agriculture and dairy initiative women are trained in making organic compost, sustainable agricultural practices such the System of Rice Intensification (SRI) and System of Wheat Intensification (SWI) and the best practices of dairy management. RGMVP also aims to promote Farmers Clubs.
Livestock management: This initiative focuses on supplementary livelihoods such as goatry, bee-keeping and poultry through facilitating access to sources and training activities.
Non-farm sector: RGMVP tried to encourage poor women to explore opportunities in the non-farm sector by providing training in activities such as stitching and embroidery, food preservation, cane furniture making, mechanised knitting, leather work, pottery making, detergent making, etc.

Health
Behaviour change management is promoted among the poor household to reduce IMR & NMR and facilitates linkages with the health system at a local level in order to improve access of health services.

Education
The organisation has also taken some initiatives in education with a view to enhance the community participation in education, encourage education of girls and promote affordable good quality children's education.

Environment
Environment friendly solar-LED lighting solutions managed through community managed Solar Energy Kiosks, and bio-gas energy for the rural poor are some other initiatives promoted by the organisation.

Outreach
Based out of Raebareli, RGMVP has(as of September 2012)reached out to around 500,000 poor households in 191 blocks of 39 districts in the most backward and poverty-stricken regions of Uttar Pradesh.

Partners
The project has been partnered with the National Bank for Agriculture and Rural Development and SERP for promotion of credit linkage and federation of SHGs in select districts of Uttar Pradesh. For its community mobilisation project on maternal and neonatal health RGMVP has partnered with Bill and Melinda Gates Foundation through a consortium headed up by the Public Health Foundation of India (PHFI) and including the Population Council, the Community Empowerment Lab, and the Center for Global Health and Development at Boston University.

See also
 Women in India
 Poverty reduction
 Millennium Development Goals
 Community economic development
 Social responsibility
 Rajiv Gandhi Charitable Trust

References

External links
 RGMVP- Official Website
 A note on RGMVP by Shoaib Sultan Khan
 A case study on RGMVP by the Livelihood School

Women's organisations based in India
Organisations based in Uttar Pradesh
Memorials to Rajiv Gandhi
2002 establishments in Uttar Pradesh
Organizations established in 2002